St. Bonaventure's School is a Roman Catholic boys' secondary school located in the Forest Gate area of Newham, London, England. Founded in 1875, the school has a long history of providing education to boys in the local community.

History

St Bonaventure's was founded as a private Roman Catholic school in 1855, by members of the Franciscan order based in the Stratford area of London. They moved to the St Antony's parish of Forest Gate in 1897, when they needed more space to build a larger school. Before the outbreak of the Second World War and for some years thereafter pupils were drawn from a large part of the County of Essex as well as the whole of the County Borough of West Ham Following the Education Act 1978 control of the school was taken over by the newly formed West Ham Education Authority and the school changed its name to West Ham (St Bonaventure's) Grammar School.

Following the Education Act 1844, the school reverted to full control by the Franciscan Order as a grammar school and soon after that became a comprehensive school with a tripartite nature (on the site there were grammar, secondary modern and technical streams). At this time the title of the school changed to St Bonaventure's. The current school jumper reflects this past, as the three stripes of colour were initially used to identify the three types of student in the school.

School patron
The school is named for St Bonaventure, a Doctor of the Church. Aged 29, he joined the Order of St Francis and promised to lead a life of poverty, chastity and obedience. He was made a cardinal by Pope Gregory X in 1973. The feast day of the patron is 25 July. This day is always cause for celebration in the school and is often used as an opportunity to give thanks to long serving members of staff.

Grammar school
It became a state secondary school following the Education Act 1902 in 1904, when schools with a religious nature could gain access to public funding, then in 1918 changed its name to West Ham Grammar School. In 1944, it became St Bonaventure's Grammar School again. The school has a strong relationship with St Antony's Church, which is adjacent to the site, and whole school masses are held there on a regular basis. It is governed by the Diocese of Brentwood and strongly encourages and incorporates liturgical worship in all aspects of school life.

Comprehensive
The school was called a "multilateral" in the tripartite system of education in England, Wales and Northern Ireland in 1960 and became a boys' comprehensive for ages 11–19. The change to a comprehensive school was successful according to the Ofsted reports and the position of the school in the annual attainment and achievement tables. The school gained Technology College status in 1994 and later it gained Language College status. As a 'high attaining school' it was also able to select a third specialism and chose applied learning. In the 2012 results St Bonaventure's was the highest performing school in Newham. The admissions criteria show that the school has a comprehensive intake, however due to over-subscription, priority is given to year 6 students that are practising Catholics.

Teaching school

The school was designated as a teaching school in February 2016. This means that the school has been judged as high performing and can take a lead role in training the next generation of school teachers, providing school to school support and supporting other teachers with their professional development.

There are other schools within a St Bonaventure's Teaching School Alliance and these are a range of secondary schools from across the Roman Catholic Diocese of Brentwood, these include;
 St John's Special school, Chigwell
 St Angela's Ursuline School, Forest Gate
 St John Payne, Chelmsford
 St Thomas More, Westcliffe-On-Sea
 Campion School, Hornchurch
 New Hall School, Chelmsford
 The Palmer Catholic Academy, Seven Kings
 St Benedict's Catholic College, Colchester
 De La Salle School, Basildon
 Holy Family Catholic School, Walthamstow

The schools have formed a Teaching School Alliance that is called the Agnus Dei Teaching School Alliance and St Mary's University, Twickenham is the Higher Education Institute partner.

Admissions

The vast majority of pupils are Roman Catholic; ethnic minorities represent the socio-economically deprived local catchment area. It is traditionally heavily oversubscribed for entry to year 7 and accepts 186 students each year.

Forms
Prior to 1969 the school's four houses were named Catherine, Clare, Francis and Mary after the four Saints on the school badge. For most of the sixties and seventies, the houses existed in name only. The current houses are listed below; Kolbe was introduced in 2014.

Atkinson – Paul Atkinson, died 1699. A Franciscan, ordained in Douai Abbey and imprisoned in Hurst Castle for 30 years for being a priest.
Bell – Arhur Bell, died in London on 11 December 1643. He became a Franciscan in Segovia, Spain, then founded the Franciscan order in Douai Abbey. Convicted for being a Roman Catholic, he was held in Newgate Prison and later hanged, drawn and quartered.
Colman – Walter Colman, died 1645. A Franciscan friar convicted of being a Roman Catholic and held in Newgate Prison, he was condemned to be hanged, drawn and quartered, but died of starvation before the sentence could be carried out.
Forest – John Forest, died 22 May 1548. Franciscan friar held in Newgate Prison. He was tortured and burned over a fire while being hung by a chain around his waist.
Gregory – Pope Gregory X, Cardinal Protector of the Franciscan Order, he made St Bonaventure a Cardinal.
Kolbe – Maximillian Kolbe, died 14 August 1941. Franciscan friar that gave up his life in Auschwitz for a stranger. He was trapped underground, starved and dehydrated. He was given a lethal injection of carbolic acid by Nazi guards.
Heath – Henry Heath, died 1643. He was convicted of being a priest and a Roman Catholic, held at Newgate Prison and hung, drawn and quartered at Tyburn.
Wall – John Wall, died 1679. A Franciscan friar ordained in Douai Abbey, and convicted for being a priest and a Roman Catholic. He was beheaded on 22 August.

School uniform and colours

The students in years 7 and 8 wear a brown blazer to retain the old link with the Franciscan order. Students wear a white, collared formal shirt with the school tie. The trousers are black and black leather shoes are worn. The school's coat is black with the school badge. A brown pullover V-necked jumper is also compulsory.

The students in years 9–11 wear a black blazer with gold edging to the lapels. Students wear a white, collared formal shirt with the school tie. The trousers are black with black leather shoes worn. A black pullover V-necked jumper is compulsory for year 9 but is optional for years 10 and 11.

The standard tie is a solid gold colour with a black diagonal stripe going down from right to left. A selection of ties is available to be awarded to boys that excel in particular subjects. These are given following excellence shown in the areas of sport (an additional green stripe), technology (an additional red stripe), languages (an additional blue stripe) and art (an additional purple stripe). In September 2011, a new tie for excellence in English and mathematics was awarded (an additional a pink stripe). In 2013 a new RE tie was introduced that will have an additional white stripe. In 2014, ties have been awarded for excellence in science and humanities. From 2015 the school has also awarded colours for success in social sciences and computing.

The students in sixth form wear a dark-coloured business suit with a formal shirt. Boys must also wear a neck-tie. Students on the sports science course must wear the designated black PE kit when having practical sports sessions.

School arms

The school badge and crest have existed in the present format since the school was founded by the Franciscan Order in the 19th century. The red hat (Galero) represents the fact that St Bonaventure was a cardinal in the Roman Catholic church. The white fleur-de-lis symbolises St Mary, the Mother of God, illustrating that the school and all Bonaventurians have a particular devotion to Mary. The Jerusalem cross on a brown background symbolises the Franciscan heritage of the school. This is also demonstrated in the uniform for Years 7 and 8 and the names used for the school Houses. The wheel symbolises St Catherine of Alexandria, also known as Saint Catherine of the Wheel. Even in Medieval times she was the patron saint of educators. The yellow shield on black background symbolises St Clare of Assisi. She was greatly influenced by the teachings of St Francis of Assisi. She eventually started the order of Poor Clares.

The motto at the base of the coat of arms states In Sanctitate Et Doctrina, "in holiness and learning", showing that all "Bon's Boys" should be faithful at all times and always try to discover something new each day throughout their lives. The motto has changed in the past; during the period as West Ham Grammar School through to the end of the Second World War the motto was Animo Et Fide (in courage and faith).

Headteachers

 Christopher McCormack (2019–present)
 Paul Halliwell, (2010–2019)
 Paul C. Doherty (interim; 2010) 
 Stephen Foster (2003–09) 
Sir Michael Wilshaw (1985–2003) 
 Owen Craddy (1974–85)
 Howard Docherty (1957–1974) 
 Hugh Lawrence O'Connor (1949–1957)
 Charles Edward Gourley (1919–49)
 A. W. L. Harrison 1907–1920
 David Fleming 1885–
 Germain Verleyen 1873–

Academic performance
The school performs well in the local and national league tables at GCSE level, and in 2012 over 99% of year 11 Pupils achieved five or more A*–C passes, above the national average.
As a Roman Catholic school, all pupils are entered for a compulsory GCSE in religious studies as well as English, maths and science. In 2005, the school became a language college, meaning that all pupils are also entered for a GCSE in a modern foreign language in French, Spanish or German.
At the end of year 9 students choose their options from a wide range of different GCSE subjects, including history, geography, PE, business studies, sociology, art, music and a selection of design technology subjects.

Sixth form

St Bonaventure's has a sixth form which gives access as a preference to the boys in year 11, as long as boys meet the entry requirements for the courses that they choose. All other places are filled by students that apply from other Secondary schools.

The sixth form offers various qualifications, from the traditional GCE A-levels to BTEC courses, and has a tradition of preparing students for admission to prestigious UK higher education institutions such as Oxbridge, Imperial College London, University College London, London School of Economics and other Russell Group universities. Many of these students go on to read subjects such as medicine, law, engineering and economics.

Sport

In 1965 the school football team won the Thomas Lipton Trophy (London & S.E Schools Cup) winning the final 7–0 against Beaufoys at the Old Spotted Dog Ground. Over the past few years the school's football and basketball teams have reached numerous national finals, such as the London Cup Final in football and the Essex Cup Final in both football and basketball. The school's cricket team have also won the Newham Cup several times. Many representatives of the school's football team have gone on to forge careers as professional footballers.

Athletics
In 2014, the school was the overall winners of the Simmons Cup, an elite athletic invitational featuring the best schools across London. The school was also joint athletics champions of the 2015 inaugural Indoor (winter) Simmons Cup with Dulwich College. In 2015, the year 9 team won the summer Simmons Cup and went on to win the indoor Simmons Cup in January 2016 as a year 10 group. In May 2016, all competing year groups won in the Newham Athletics finals, meaning that St Bon's will represent Newham for year 7, year 8, year 9 and year 10.

Basketball
In 2008 St Bonaventure's became English Schools Basketball Association Under 14 boys national champions, and in doing so became the first team to achieve such a feat in the school's history. It repeated the feat in 2015, with the under 15 beating Holy Trinity and City of Leicester in the finals.

In 2016, St Bon's beat all previous English basketball records by all five year groups becoming Basketball England national champions. The year 7 competed in the Junior NBA winning the final on 22 March 2016. On the weekend of Friday 6 May 2016 to Sunday 8 May 2016, year 11 won, then year 10, followed by year 9 on Saturday then year 8 on Sunday. In September 2016, the school was accepted onto the elite Academy Basketball League (ABL) for post 16 due to the success of the school in all year groups below the sixth form.

Football
In 2013, the year 10 team won the Dewar Shield. In 2015, the year 9 football team became the under-14 Essex FA Jubilee Cup Champions and the year 7 football team won the Lyca Mobile WHUFC Community Cup. The finals were held in the Boleyn Ground and St Bon's beat WHUFC under-12's 2–1.

Bon's Boys
Alumni of St Bonaventure's are known as Bonaventurians and informally as Bon's Boys. The following people have been educated at St Bonaventure's:

 Chuba Akpom, footballer
 Sir David Amess, British Conservative politician, MP for Southend West
 Chuks Aneke, footballer
 Charles Babalola, actor Winner of the prestigious Alan Bates Bursary in 2014.
 Alex Bailey, former footballer
 Peter Bakare, volleyball player
 Timothy Campbell, The Apprentice 2005 series winner and businessman, current chair of the governing body of St Bonaventure's
 John Chiedozie, former footballer
 Ted Childs, film and TV producer
 Jermain Defoe, footballer
 D Double E, musician
 Anthony Edgar, footballer
 Peter Fahy, former Chief Constable of Greater Manchester Police
 Edward Fennessy, electronics engineer, developer of the radar
 Desmond FitzGerald, Irish nationalist politician, father of Irish Taoiseach Garret FitzGerald.
 Clayton Fortune, footballer
 Chris Hughton, former footballer, football manager
 John Junkin, actor
 Denis King, musician
 Terry Lawless, boxing manager and trainer
 Martin Ling former footballer, football manager
 Stephen Mulhern, TV presenter and entertainer
 Glen Murphy, actor
 Billy Murray, actor
 Bondz N'Gala, footballer
 Bobby Seagull, TV Celebrity & Mathematician
 Steve John Shepherd, actor
 Kiell Smith-Bynoe, actor
 Alex Stavrinou footballer
 Tinchy Stryder, musician
 Alton Thelwell, footballer
 Les Thompson, footballer

References

External links
 
 
 Profile, EduBase.gov.uk. Retrieved 6 May 2014.

Secondary schools in the London Borough of Newham
Catholic secondary schools in the Diocese of Brentwood
Boys' schools in London
 
Educational institutions established in 1875
1875 establishments in England
Voluntary aided schools in London
Forest Gate